The 2018–19 Japan Figure Skating Championships were held on December 20–24, 2018 in Osaka. It was the 87th edition of the event. Medals were awarded in the disciplines of men's singles, ladies' singles, pair skating, and ice dancing.

Results

Men

Ladies

Pairs

Ice dance

Japan Junior Figure Skating Championships
The 2018–19 Junior Championships took place on November 23–25, 2018 in Fukuoka.

Men

Ladies

International team selections
On 25 December 2018, the Japan Skating Federation published its selections for the 2019 World Championships, 2019 Four Continents Championships, 2019 World Junior Championships, and 2019 Winter Universiade.

World Championships
The 2019 World Championships were held on March 18–24, 2019 in Saitama, Japan.

Four Continents Championships
The 2019 Four Continents Championships were held on February 7–10, 2019 in Anaheim, United States.

World Junior Championships
The 2019 World Junior Championships were held on March 4–10, 2019 in Zagreb, Croatia.

Winter Universiade
The 2019 Winter Universiade were held on March 4–9, 2019 in Krasnoyarsk, Russia.

References

Japan Figure Skating Championships
Japan Championships
Figure Skating Championships